The 1928 Hanley by-election was held on 23 April 1928.  The by-election was held due to the death of the incumbent Labour MP, Samuel Clowes.  It was won by the Labour candidate Arthur Hollins.

Candidates
The Liberal Party candidate was Walter Meakin, a 52-year-old Stafford man. Meakin was born in 1876 and educated at Trinity College, Cambridge and the London School of Economics. He qualified as a Barrister-at-law but did not practise. From 1915-19 
he served in France with the 5th North Staffordshire Regiment. He then served as a Justice of the Peace. Meakin had stood for parliament before, at five general elections:  December 1910 at West Staffordshire, 1918 at Stafford, 1922 at Birmingham King's Norton and 1923 and 1924 at Stone. In 1923, he had finished second, just 314 votes behind the Conservative. He had been re-selected to contest Stone for a third time at the next general election, but was drafted for the Hanley by-election.

Result

Aftermath
Following the by-election Walter Meakin returned to contest Stone at the 1929 and 1931 general elections, before contesting Loughborough at the 1935 general election, each time without success.

References

1928 in England
Politics of Stoke-on-Trent
1928 elections in the United Kingdom
By-elections to the Parliament of the United Kingdom in Staffordshire constituencies
20th century in Staffordshire
April 1928 events